Stanley Joseph Hilliard Howard (19 April 1916 – 3 August 1982) was an Australian rules footballer who played with Geelong in the Victorian Football League (VFL).

Football

Geelong (VFL)
He played on the half-back flank for the Geelong Second XVIII team that defeated Collingwood 12.12 (84) to 9.11 (65), at the MCG on Thursday, 30 September 1937, to win the 1937 VFL Second's premiership.

Notes

References

 World War Two Nominal Roll: Lieutenant Stanley Joseph Hilliard Howard (VX111527), Department of Veterans' Affairs.
 World War Two Service Record: Lieutenant Stanley Joseph Hilliard Howard (VX111527), National Archives of Australia.

External links 

1916 births
1982 deaths
Australian rules footballers from Victoria (Australia)
Geelong Football Club players
Terang Football Club players